Hive Social is a microblogging service and mobile app. The app received news coverage during the acquisition of Twitter by Elon Musk in November 2022.

Hive Social was developed by Raluca Pop, also known as Kassandra Pop, with the help of a freelance developer, and the first version launched on the Apple App Store in October 2019. A beta version for Android was released via the Google Play store on November 10, 2022. The app has been described as a hybrid between Twitter, Instagram and Tumblr, with text, image and video posts supported. Hive is rated for ages 17+ and explicit images are permitted, including sexual intercourse, genitalia and nude close-ups. Hive features a chronological timeline with no personalisation algorithms, while profiles offer a MySpace-like song playing feature.

 the app has reached number one on the top free social apps on the App Store and has over one million user accounts, despite email verification limits being reached.

On 30 November 2022, "zerforschung", a German hacker collective, published information about severe security issues with Hive Social, among them the possibility to access all personal data, including private posts, private messages, shared media and even deleted direct messages. This also included private email addresses and phone numbers entered during login. Attackers could also overwrite data such as posts owned by other users. In response to the publication of the security report, Hive abruptly shut down their service to attempt to address the vulnerabilities. As of December 15, 2022, Hive's servers were back online and the platform returned online. The app also left beta on Android devices and saw a full release on the Google Play Store. Some features were disabled in the 2.0.0 update after the shutdown, such as direct messages, music, and polls.

See also 
 Mastodon (social media)

References

External links 
 

Internet properties established in 2019
Microblogging services
Social networking services
Social networking mobile apps
Social networking websites
2019 establishments in Brazil
Android (operating system) software
IOS software